Count Maurycy Klemens Zamoyski (30 July 1871 – 5 May 1939) was a Polish nobleman (szlachcic), politician, social activist, and Minister of Foreign Affairs in the Polish government of the 1920s.

Life
Maurycy was the 15th Lord of the Zamość estate and the biggest land owner in pre-World War II Poland. He co-founded and chaired the Agricultural Society in 1903. In 1906, he was elected to the State Duma of the Russian Empire as a representative of Lublin Governorate. During the First World War he was the vice-chairman of the Polish National Committee in Warsaw and later vice-chairman of the Polish National Committee in Paris.

He campaigned in the 1922 presidential elections as a candidate of the right-wing supported by various political parties, most notably the National Democrats. He won four rounds of the election only to lose out in the final round to the surprise victor Gabriel Narutowicz, who was hence elected President of Poland. From 1919–1924 ambassador in Paris; from 19 January 1924 until 27 July 1924 Minister of Foreign Affairs.

Personal life
He married Princess Maria Róża Sapieha on 18 July 1906 in Białka Szlachecka.

Honours
Grand Cordon of the Order of Polonia Restituta (Poland)
Commander's Cross with Star of the Order of Polonia Restituta (Poland)
Grand Officer of the Legion of Honour (France)    
Grand Cross of the Order of the Dannebrog (Denmark)  
Grand Cross of the Order of Orange-Nassau (Netherlands)  
Grand Cross of the Order of the Crown of Italy (Italy)

See also
Zamoyski family
List of szlachta

References

1871 births
1939 deaths
Nobility from Warsaw
People from Warsaw Governorate
Muricy Klemens
Counts of Poland
Popular National Union politicians
Ministers of Foreign Affairs of the Second Polish Republic
Members of the 1st State Duma of the Russian Empire
Members of the Polish National Committee (1914–1917)
Members of the Polish National Committee (1917–1919)
Ambassadors of Poland to France
Politicians from Warsaw